is a train station on the Osaka Metro Tanimachi Line in Harinakano Itchome, Higashisumiyoshi-ku, Osaka, Japan.

Layout
There is an island platform with two tracks on the second basement.

Surroundings
Komagawa Shopping Arcade (駒川商店街)
Osaka Municipal Higashisumiyoshi Library
Osaka Municipal Nakano Junior High School

Bus stop
Komagawa, Subway Komagawa-Nakano (Osaka City Bus)
Route 3: for Subway Suminoekoen / for Deto Bus Terminal

External links

 Official Site 
 Official Site 

Higashisumiyoshi-ku, Osaka
Osaka Metro stations

Railway stations in Japan opened in 1980